The International Civil Aviation Organization Public Key Directory (ICAO PKD) is a database maintained by the International Civil Aviation Organization holding national cryptographic keys related to the authentication of e-passport information.

A September 2011 United States Central Intelligence Agency document released by WikiLeaks in December 2014 explains the purpose and scope of the system:

The United Nations became the first non-state participant in October 2012, enabling issuing of e-UNLP, the electronic form of the United Nations laissez-passer.

In December 2014, ICAO reported the PKD as having 45 participants.

In 2015 the German Bundesdruckerei (German Federal Printing Office) won the request for tender of the ICAO to provide the ICAO PKD.

In July 2017, ICAO reported the PKD as having 58 participants.

As of November 2017, 60 participants were part of the ICAO PKD, with the European Union being the 60th member and at the same time the second non-state participant.

See also
 Passenger name record
 Passport
 Biometric passport
 Machine-readable passport
 Public-key cryptography

References

External links
 ICAO PKD entry page
 ICAO PKD (Public Key Directory) data download

Travel technology